The Ministry of Labour and Vocational Training is a government ministry of Cambodia responsible for issues such as labour, workforce, and vocational education. It was founded in 1993. Its current minister is Ith Samheng.

References

Government ministries of Cambodia
Phnom Penh
Cambodia
Ministries established in 1993
1993 establishments in Cambodia